Renate Titzia Groenewold (born 8 October 1976) is a Dutch former long track speed skater and road bicycle racer.

Groenewold has won several Dutch Championships.  In 1999, 2002 and 2003 she won the Dutch allround championship. At the European Allround Championships she has won various medals. Five times she came in third in the overall ranking. In 2005, she won the silver medal which was her best result at the European Championships. In 2001, she also came in third in the overall ranking on the World Allround Championships, which she won in 2004.

Besides participating in the all-round championships Groenewold has participated in the championships for individual distances. Her best results there were winning the team pursuit in 2008 and the 3000 meters in 2009.

In 2002 Groenewold participated at the 2002 Winter Olympics. She won the silver medal in the 3000 m. However, on the 1500 m she fell in the second turn. At the 2006 Winter Olympics, rookie compatriot Ireen Wüst beat her to the gold on the 3000 m, leaving Groenewold with silver once more.

In 2007, Groenewold joined Team DSB Bank, which was a women's professional cycling team that competed in international and UCI Women's Road World Cup events. In 2010, Groenewold competed again at the 2010 Winter Olympics, in Vancouver. She falsely listed as one of lesbian athletes at the Games.

After her active skating career she was a coach from 2011 until 2014. In October 2018 she was appointed in the speed skating Technical Committee of the International Skating Union (ISU).

Personal records

References

External links 

 
 Renate Groenewold at SpeedSkatingStats.com

 

1976 births
People from Veendam
Sportspeople from Groningen (province)
Dutch female speed skaters
Dutch female cyclists
Olympic speed skaters of the Netherlands
Speed skaters at the 2002 Winter Olympics
Speed skaters at the 2006 Winter Olympics
Speed skaters at the 2010 Winter Olympics
Olympic silver medalists for the Netherlands
Olympic medalists in speed skating
Medalists at the 2006 Winter Olympics
Medalists at the 2002 Winter Olympics
Universiade medalists in speed skating
Living people
World Allround Speed Skating Championships medalists
Universiade gold medalists for the Netherlands
Competitors at the 1997 Winter Universiade
Dutch speed skating coaches
Dutch sports coaches
20th-century Dutch women
21st-century Dutch women